BeInMedia Agency is a Digital Advertising agency based in Kuwait offering digital marketing solutions to local and international businesses including government organisations and non-profit organisations.

History
The company was established in 2008 and has since expanded its operations to Dubai and Doha. BeInMedia Agency's basic services have been online marketing, social media marketing, email marketing and animated video marketing, however, the company has also reported to have been providing digital solutions like search engine optimization and app / website development to international tech companies.

The notable digital marketing and development works by the company include working for Starcom, Samsung and MasterCard.

References

Mass media in Kuwait